In the October 9, 1832 elections, Joel B. Sutherland (D) was re-elected to the , but resigned his seat to accept a judgeship.  He then subsequently resigned that judgeship to run in this October 8, 1833 special election which was called to fill the vacancy caused by his original resignation, and won that election.

Election results

There were also 57 votes for someone with the surname of Martin, first name and party affiliation unknown.

See also
List of special elections to the United States House of Representatives

References

Pennsylvania 1833 01
Pennsylvania 1833 01
1833 01
Pennsylvania 01
United States House of Representatives 01
United States House of Representatives 1833 01